Bilić, also known as Bilići, is a small settlement (hamlet) in Serbia. It is situated in the Sombor municipality, West Bačka District, Vojvodina province.

Geography

Officially, Bilić is not classified as a separate settlement, but as suburban part of the town of Sombor. It is located between Sombor, Svetozar Miletić, and Rančevo.

References

Vojvodina - auto karta, Magic Map, Smederevska Palanka, 2001.

See also
Sombor
List of places in Serbia
List of cities, towns and villages in Vojvodina

Places in Bačka
Sombor
West Bačka District